USS Enterprise (CVN-80) will be the third  to be built for the United States Navy. She will be the ninth United States naval vessel and third aircraft carrier to bear the name, and is scheduled to be in operation by 2028. Her construction began in August 2017 with a steel-cutting ceremony.

Naming
She will be the ninth ship and the third aircraft carrier in the history of the United States Navy to bear the name. CVN-80 will also be the first American supercarrier not to be named in honor of a person since  was commissioned in 1966. In December 2016, Mabus chose Olympic gold medalists Katie Ledecky and Simone Biles to sponsor the ship.

Construction

CVN-80 is being built by Huntington Ingalls Industries' Newport News Shipbuilding in Newport News, Virginia. CVN-80 is the first aircraft carrier completely designed and built through digital platforms. The first cut of steel ceremony, marking the beginning of fabrication of the ship's components, was held on 21 August 2017, with ship's sponsors Katie Ledecky and Simone Biles present. Construction began in advance of the purchase contract and construction award, in early 2018. Steel from CVN-65 will be recycled and used in the construction of CVN-80. As of August 2022, approximately 20,000 pounds of steel, from CVN-65, has been salvaged and recycled for inclusion into CVN-80, with another 15,000 pounds still to be processed, for a total of 35,000 pounds. Enterprise will also incorporate four portholes taken from CV-6, her World War II predecessor. Enterprise will replace  and is scheduled to be launched in November 2025, with a planned delivery date of March 2028.

The ship's keel was laid, with no ceremony, on 5 April 2022, three weeks ahead of schedule, making the ship about 13% complete. The shipbuilder held an official keel-laying ceremony on 27 August of the same year.

See also
 List of aircraft carriers of the United States Navy
 List of ships of the United States Navy named Enterprise

References

External links

 DoD press release naming CVN-80 Enterprise

 

Gerald R. Ford-class aircraft carriers